Master control is the technical hub of a broadcast operation common among most over-the-air television stations and television networks. It is distinct from a production control room (PCR) in television studios where the activities such as switching from camera to camera are coordinated. A transmission control room (TCR) is usually smaller in size and is a scaled down version of centralcasting.

Master control is the final point before a signal is transmitted over-the-air for terrestrial television or cablecast, satellite provider for broadcast, or sent on to a cable television operator. Television master control rooms include banks of video monitors, satellite receivers, videotape machines, video servers, transmission equipment, and, more recently, computer broadcast automation equipment for recording and playback of television programming.

Master control is generally staffed with one or two master control operators around-the-clock to ensure continuous operation. Master control operators are responsible for monitoring the quality and accuracy of the on-air product, ensuring the transmission meets government regulations, troubleshooting equipment malfunctions, and preparing programming for playout.  Regulations include both technical ones (such as those against over-modulation and dead air), as well as content ones (such as indecency and station ID).

Many television networks and radio networks or station groups have consolidated facilities and now operate multiple stations from one regional master control or centralcasting center. An example of this centralized broadcast programming system on a large scale is  NBC's "hub-spoke project" that enables a single "hub" to have control of dozens of stations' automation systems and to monitor their air signals, thus reducing or eliminating some responsibilities of local employees at their owned-and-operated (O&O) stations. 

Outside the United States, the Canadian Broadcasting Corporation (CBC) manages four radio networks, two broadcast television networks, and several more cable/satellite radio and television services out of just two master control points (English language services at the Canadian Broadcasting Centre in Toronto and French language at Maison Radio-Canada in Montreal). Many other public and private broadcasters in Canada have taken a similar approach.

Gallery

See also
 Network operations center
 Central apparatus room
 Transmission control room

Broadcast engineering
Broadcasting
Television terminology
Rooms